Pusillimonas soli is a Gram-negative, oxidase- and catalase-positive, non-spore-forming, motile bacterium of the genus Pusillimonas, isolated from farm soil near Daejeon in South Korea.

References

External links
Type strain of Pusillimonas soli at BacDive -  the Bacterial Diversity Metadatabase

Burkholderiales
Bacteria described in 2010